The Kamloops Crown of Curling  (formerly the Hub International Crown of Curling, Valley First Crown of Curling, Strauss Crown of Curling, Labatt's Crown of Curling, Labatt Crown of Curling, Thompson Crown of Curling, Thompson Hotel Crown of Curling, and Barton Insurance Crown of Curling) is an annual bonspiel, or curling tournament, held in October at the Kamloops Curling Club in Kamloops. The purse for the event is CAD $15,000 for the men's event and $11,000 for the women's event.

The event has been held since 1974.

Past champions

Men

Women

References

External links
 Kamloops Curling Club website

Sport in Kamloops
Curling in British Columbia